Nishan "Nish" Selvadurai (born 10 September 1978) is an Australian comedian of Sri Lankan descent, living in Brisbane.

Career
Nish first performed stand-up in 2004. In 2005, he won the Queensland State Final of the FHM Cougar Rum Search for Australia's Funniest Man competition. In 2006, he had his television debut on Network 10 and the Comedy Channel for the FHM Cougar Rum Search for Australia's Funniest Man competition. In March 2007, he enjoyed his first month as a full-time professional comedian. He was the warm up act for George Kapiniaris's Adelaide Fringe Festival show "Trevor". He then joined the touring comedy group Il Dago. Il Dago began at the Melbourne International Comedy Festival in April 2007. The tour included Joe Avati & George Kapiniaris.

Nish has appeared twice on the Australian television improvised comedy series Thank God You're Here. He has also appeared on Channel 9's NRL Footy Show and Sea Patrol.

References

External links
 Official site for Nish
 Official site for Il Dago

Australian male comedians
Australian people of Sri Lankan Tamil descent
1978 births
Living people